Hardial Singh Bajaj (born April 5, 1905 in Khanga Dogran, British India died September 18, 1967 in Singapore) was a prominent Southeast Asian of Indian origin. He was the son of Mehar Singh (father) and Thakur Devi (mother), the eldest of six children. He was married to Kirpal Kaur, daughter of Tara Singh (Lalaji).

Career
He later migrated to Kuala Lumpur, Malaya and became a renowned textile merchant. He was associated with Gian Singh & Co., Hardial Singh & Co. and Hardial Singh & Sons. “King of Textiles” was pronounced by The Statesman when he landed in Calcutta, India. He was a real estate investor and a spices as well as a films trader.

During World War II in Singapore, the Imperial Japanese Army Anti-Espionage Department imprisoned and tortured him. They burnt him with cigarette butts thinking him to be a spy. Sardar Singh Chatwal arranged for special meals and his release. He was rumoured to have been considered for knighthood and having lost that opportunity by unwittingly having imported shirts in violation of the Arrow (shirts) trademark.

He joined the Indian Independence League in 1945, during World War II. He served as Special Supply Officer for Subhas Chandra Bose. He handed over custody of the sacks of gold entrusted to him during the War, to the Indian Overseas Bank in Singapore. Jawaharlal Nehru took possession of the gold on behalf of the Indian government.

Source: Narinjan Singh Bajaj, son of Hardial Singh

A Singapore pioneer. President of the Indian Chamber in Singapore from 1949 to 1953. Source: The Straits Times

References

External links
Hardial Singh's Genealogy
 Hyodo Case
Hardial Singh's Family – Bajaj Family Web Site and Blog

1905 births
1967 deaths
Indian Sikhs
People from British India
Indian torture victims